V for Visa is a short dark romantic comedy film about an American who is facing deportation from Scotland. His only solution is to marry someone and quick. V for Visa is the second installment of a trilogy of short films by Worrying Drake Productions.

Plot
Brad (Tyler Collins) is an American musician facing deportation from Scotland when his visa application is rejected. Without any other conceivable alternative, he has to marry someone to stay in the country and asks his band's stalker Stacey (Natalie Wallace) if she would go along with his plan. However, after the ceremony, it becomes clear that Stacey is not as she seems and already has plans for the newly wed couple.

Main cast
Tyler Collins as Brad
Natalie Wallace as Stacey
Emma Claire Brightlyn as the Visa Lady
Jack Nelson as Scott
Francis Carroll as Dav
Pol McGowan as Derek
Jim Sweeney as the Stacey's Dad
Jackie McPhail as Stacey's Mum
Lauren Lamarr as the Minister
John Gaffney as Homeless Man 1
 Joe Cassidy as Homeless Man 2

Release
V for Visa was released on 26 August 2013 and had its North American premiere at the Robert De Niro's Tribeca Film Centre as part of the Bootleg Film Festival in New York where McPhail picked up the Best Director accolade.

Awards

References

External links
 
 Worry Drake Productions Website
 V for Visa Trailer

Films set in Scotland
Films shot in Scotland
Scottish films
2013 films
English-language Scottish films
Films set in Glasgow
British independent films
2013 romantic comedy films
British romantic comedy films
2013 independent films
2010s English-language films
Films directed by John McPhail
2010s British films